Nicholas Roy is a Canadian-American computer scientist at the Massachusetts Institute of Technology. He is Professor of Aeronautics and Astronautics at MIT and a principal investigator at the MIT Computer Science and Artificial Intelligence Laboratory. His research focuses on robotics, machine learning, autonomous systems, planning and reasoning, human-computer interaction and micro air vehicles and also principles of autonomy and decision-making. He received his PhD under Sebastian Thrun and Tom Mitchell at Carnegie Mellon University in 2003.

References

MIT School of Engineering faculty
American aerospace engineers
Living people
Year of birth missing (living people)